The Davenant Centre, situated in Whitechapel in the East End of London, England, is known as a 'centre of excellence' for youth services in the London Borough of Tower Hamlets. The Davenant Centre was built to remember the community work of the Reverend Ralph Davenant, Rector of Whitechapel, who left a legacy to educate forty boys and thirty girls. A building was first erected on the Whitechapel site of the present Davenant Centre in 1660. A school was built following the death of Reverend Ralph Davenant in 1680 and re-built and expanded in 1818 and 1896. The rear building of the present Davenant Centre has a Grade II Renaissance Style Listing.

The Davenant Centre is part of the East End community and is in regular use by voluntary groups in Tower Hamlets.

See also 
Reverend Ralph Davenant
Davenant Foundation School
Christopher Seward
Davenant International
Loughton
Whitechapel

External links 

Davenant Centre
New London Architecture: Davenant Centre
Bassac Listing
Davenant Foundation School
Davenant International website

Grade II listed buildings in the London Borough of Tower Hamlets
Education in the London Borough of Tower Hamlets
Community centres in London
Whitechapel